The Women's 50 metre butterfly competition of the 2022 European Aquatics Championships was held on 12 and 13 August 2022.

Records
Prior to the competition, the existing world, European and championship records were as follows.

Results

Heats
The heats were started on 12 August at 09:00.

Semifinals
The semifinals were started at 18:42.

Final
The final was held on 13 August at 18:17.

References

Women's 50 metre butterfly